Photo Bits was a British softcore pornography weekly magazine published from 9 July 1898 until 9 December 1914. It was mentioned in James Joyce's Ulysses. The magazine was long targeted by hostile forces concerned about social "purity". The editor of the magazine faced arrest and prosecution. The magazine was later renamed Bits of Fun. Photo Bits was completely different from other magazines or papers of that time, and was classified as a "comic" paper in contemporary press directories. It was the United Kingdom's first pin-up magazine.

The contents of the magazine generally included one serial story written by Derk Fortesque, multiple short stories, different comic pieces, and photographs, drawings and sketches of clothed and nude showgirls and stars of the theater world. Photo Bits also featured a weekly article discussing miscellaneous aspects of the show business, written by some anonymous person before 11 January 1908, by a person with the pseudonym 'The Amorist' after that date, and by an American who used the pseudonym 'Cosmopolite' from 23 July 1910. The contribution of 'The Amorist' towards the development of the magazine was the introduction of tight-lacing and high heels subjects. Cosmopolite introduced a new feature by inviting readers to write to him about their fetishes. In early 1912, Derk Fortesque dies and 'Cosmopolite' left the magazine. As a result, the character of the magazine changed. The Photo Bits was involved in publishing fetishist literature. The serial story "Peggy Paget's Patent Paralyzing Pedal Props" was published in the magazine in 1910. The magazine also featured 18-inch high-heel fetish shoes.

References

Further reading

External links
 Photo Bits, cover image

Pornographic magazines published in the United Kingdom
Weekly magazines published in the United Kingdom
Defunct magazines published in the United Kingdom
Magazines established in 1898
Magazines disestablished in 1914